Vladislav Igorevich Mirzoev (born 21 November 1996) is a Russian pair skater. With his former partner, Anastasia Mishina, he is the 2016 World Junior silver medalist and the 2016 JGP Final champion. On the national level, they are the 2016 Russian Junior champion.

Personal life 
Mirzoev was born on 21 November 1996 in Vladikavkaz, North Ossetia, Russian Federation. Around 2014, he enrolled at the Lesgaft Institute of Physiculture in Saint Petersburg.

Career 
Mirzoev began skating in 2007 after an ice rink opened in Vladikavkaz. As a singles skater, he was coached by Alexandr Mugdusov in Vladikavkaz, by Nadyr Kurbanov in Rostov-on-Don (2011–13), and by Alla Piatova in Saint Petersburg (2013–14).

Partnership with Mishina 
Mirzoev began pair skating in early 2014 when he teamed up with Anastasia Mishina. Coached by Nikolai Velikov and Ludmila Velikova, they won the junior pairs' title at the 2015 Bavarian Open, their first international event.

Mishina/Mirozev made their Junior Grand Prix (JGP) debut in September 2015, placing 5th in Colorado Springs, Colorado. It was the pair's sole assignment of the 2015–16 JGP series. In January 2016, they won gold at the Russian Junior Championships after placing first in both segments and outscoring silver medalists Amina Atakhanova / Ilia Spiridonov by a margin of 6.89 points. In February, they won their second consecutive Bavarian Open junior title, finishing ahead of Renata Ohanesian / Mark Bardei (silver) by 7.12 points.

In March, Mishina/Mirzoev won the silver medal at the 2016 World Junior Championships in Debrecen, Hungary, after placing second in both segments. They finished 9.22 points behind gold medalists Anna Dušková / Martin Bidař of the Czech Republic and 3.6 points ahead of teammates Ekaterina Borisova / Dmitry Sopot.

Mishina/Mirzoev were awarded gold at both of their 2016–17 JGP assignments, in Saransk, Russia, and Dresden, Germany. They were the top qualifiers at the JGP Final and won gold at the event, which was held in December in Marseille, France.

In January 2017, Mishina stated that they would likely split, due to disagreements, but that they intended to complete the season. She said that he was struggling with her weight but that it was not possible for her to lose more.

Programs 
(with Mishina)

Competitive highlights 
JGP: Junior Grand Prix

With Mishina

Detailed results 

With Mishina

References

External links 

 
 

1996 births
Russian male pair skaters
World Junior Figure Skating Championships medalists
Living people
Sportspeople from Vladikavkaz
Ossetian people
Russian people of Ossetian descent